Merrill Lake may refer to:

Merrill Lake (Merrill Creek), a lake in Ontario
Merrill Lake (Washington), a lake in Washington

See also
Little Merrill Lake (Merrill Creek)